The television show Dallas originally aired as a five-episode miniseries starting on the first Sunday of April 1978. These five episodes were originally intended to be the show's pilot but by the time they aired, it was thought that no further episodes would be made. However, the popularity of the miniseries led to the creation of an additional thirteen full seasons, ending after the fourteenth.

Production
The original miniseries was shot over six weeks during the winter of 1977, on location in Dallas, Texas. The Cloyce Box Ranch served as the first 'South Fork Ranch' exterior, and a  Swiss Avenue building was used for the interior stage sets.

Cast

Starring
In alphabetical order:
 Barbara Bel Geddes as Miss Ellie Ewing (5 episodes)
 Jim Davis as Jock Ewing (5 episodes)
 Patrick Duffy as Bobby Ewing (5 episodes)
 Larry Hagman as J.R. Ewing (5 episodes)
 Victoria Principal as Pamela Barnes Ewing (5 episodes)
 Charlene Tilton as Lucy Ewing (5 episodes)

Also starring
 Linda Gray as Sue Ellen Ewing (5 episodes)
 Steve Kanaly as Ray Krebbs (4 episodes)
 Ken Kercheval as Cliff Barnes (3 episodes)

Special guest star
 David Wayne as Willard "Digger" Barnes (2 episodes)

Notable guest stars
The most notable among the first season's recurring guest stars were Tina Louise as J.R.'s secretary/mistress Julie Grey, Donna Bullock as the first of four actresses to portray Bobby's original secretary, Connie Brasher, and Jo McDonnell as Ray's girlfriend Maureen.

Major non-recurring guest stars included: Jeffrey Byron as Lucy's schoolmate, Roger Hurley, and Paul Tulley as their teacher Mr. Miller (episode 2); Norman Alden as Ewing family friend and US Senator William "Wild Bill" Orloff (episode 3); Brian Dennehy and Cooper Huckabee as Luther Frick and Peyton Allen, who held the Ewing women hostage in an attempt to get revenge on J.R. and Ray (episode 4); and James Canning as Cliff's and Pam's cousin Jimmy Monahan, who was recast with Philip Levien for the season 2 premiere, and then never seen again (episode 5).

Crew
Series creator David Jacobs wrote the first and final episodes of the season and served as the executive script consultant (i.e. showrunner). He remained as the creative consultant until mid-way through the second season, when he left his day-to-day involvement with Dallas to create, and later serve as showrunner on spinoff series Knots Landing. The three other episodes were written by Virginia Aldridge, which was her only involvement with the show, Arthur Bernard Lewis, who remained on the show until the end and wrote the teleplay for the two reunion movies; and Camille Marchetta, who left during season four.

Lee Rich and Philip Capice served as executive producers. Rich stayed on the show until the season three finale, and Capice left his duties at the end of the ninth season. Future showrunner Leonard Katzman's involvement with the first season was limited to being the producer, and Cliff Fenneman—who served as producer for the final three seasons of the show—was the associate producer. The directing duties of the season were shared by Robert Day and Irving J. Moore.

DVD release
The first and second seasons were released by Warner Home Video on a Region 1 DVD box set on August 24, 2004. It includes five double-sided DVDs. Alongside the 29 episodes of the first two seasons, it also features a SOAPNet’s Soap Talk Dallas reunion featurette, and three commentary tracks by actors Larry Hagman, Charlene Tilton, and series creator David Jacobs.

Episodes

Nielsen ratings

References

General references

 

1978 American television seasons
1970s American television miniseries
Dallas (1978 TV series) seasons